Martina Wegman (born 13 June 1989) is a Dutch slalom canoeist who has competed at the international level since 2014.

She won a silver medal in the Extreme K1 event at the 2018 ICF Canoe Slalom World Championships in Rio de Janeiro. She also won the overall World Cup title in the Extreme K1 in 2018, the first season when this event counted for world cup points.

Wegman competed at the 2020 Summer Olympics in Tokyo where she finished 7th in the K1 event.

World Cup individual podiums

1 World Championship counting for World Cup points

References

External links

Official website

1989 births
Living people
Dutch female canoeists
Medalists at the ICF Canoe Slalom World Championships
People from Schoorl
Canoeists at the 2020 Summer Olympics
Olympic canoeists of the Netherlands
Sportspeople from North Holland
21st-century Dutch women